Forever Now is the 10th studio album released by British pop musical group Level 42, released in March 1994. There were two releases of the album with different track-listings and cover art. The first release in 1994 on RCA Records has 11 tracks. In 1996, the album was re-issued by the label Resurgence, with 15 tracks including six additional tracks, but without the songs "Tired Of Waiting" and "All Over You". Also, some of the songs on this version varied in length from those on the RCA release, and the track "Billy's Gone" was completely remixed. The Resurgence album was re-released in 2009 by the label Edsel, as a double CD, bringing "Tired Of Waiting" and "All Over You" back to the track-listing again, and also adding extended remixes of "All Over You", "Forever Now", "Learn To Say No" and "Love In A Peaceful World". The sleeve notes for the reissue state that the Resurgence version of the album contained the original intended track- listing.

It was the final album release for Level 42 before their original break-up, and was their last album of the 90s to feature the participation of three original members: Mark King, Mike Lindup and Phil Gould. Level 42 released a new album in 2006, named Retroglide, with King, Lindup and Gary Husband and a small participation by Boon Gould. Phil Gould, dismayed at what he felt was the record company's ineptitude, did not go on the road with the band on their Forever Now tour. He was replaced for the tour with live session drummer Gavin Harrison, and Jakko Jakszyk rejoined on guitar.

Three singles were issued from the album: "Forever Now", "All Over You" and "Love in a Peaceful World" - all of these reached the Top 40.

Track listing

1994 RCA Version

1996 Resurgence Version

2009 Edsel Version

Personnel 

Level 42
Mark King – vocals, bass guitar, organ, loops, synths, harp
Mike Lindup – vocals, synths, Rhodes, grand piano,  Wurlitzer, Hammond XB2
Phil Gould – vocals, acoustic piano, drums, drum loops, organ
with:
Wally Badarou – vocals, synths, guitars, Yamaha DX7 Rhodes, Hammond XB2
Danny Blume (Erroneously credited as "Danny Bloom") – guitars
Miles Bould – percussion
Mitey - voice on "All Over You"
Brass Section
Gary Barnacle – saxophones
John Thirkell, Derek Watkins and Stuart Brooks – trumpets
Richard Edwards – trombone
Strings
String arrangements on "Love In A Peaceful World' and "Romance" by Mike Lindup
On "Romance", "Talking In Your Sleep" and Don't Bother Me: Opus 20 directed by Ann Morfee, led by Chris Tombling
On "Love Is A Peaceful World" led by Gavin Wright

Charts

Album charts

Single charts

References

External links
 Official Level 42 website

Level 42 albums
1994 albums
Albums produced by Wally Badarou
RCA Records albums